Gaysper is an LGBT symbol based on the ghost emoji (U+1F47B, "👻") of Android 5.0. It is a modification of the original icon that uses a background with the colors of the rainbow flag. It became popular in Spain from April 2019 following a tweet posted on the official account of the populist right-wing party Vox, after which a multitude of users belonging to the LGBT collective began to use it as a representative symbol of itself. The icon has established itself as an example of the phenomenon of reappropriation of elements of the anti-LGBT discourse in contemporary society through social networks.

Origin and popularization 
On 28 April 2019, general elections were being held in Spain. The same day, the populist right-wing party Vox shared a controversial tweet in which it invited its voters to vote through the claim "Let the battle begin!". The message was accompanied by a photomontage of Aragorn, a protagonist of the Lord of the Rings saga, in which he appeared facing a crowd of orcs, whose figure had been modified and replaced with symbols contrary to the party's ideology: the feminist symbol, the hammer and sickle, the flag of the Second Spanish Republic and the Catalan independence senyera, several logos of media outlets such as El País or Cadena SER, the symbol of the raised fist, the symbol of the anti-fascist movement and, among them, a modified version of the ghost emoji (👻) of the Android 5.0 version with the colors of the LGBT flag.

The use of the symbol in the tweet met with an initial negative reaction from the LGBT community on Twitter. However, it would later end up using it for the creation of memes, and finally as a symbol of the collective in a phenomenon of reappropriation. The icon would end up being known as Gaysper, in a portmanteau of the word "gay" and Casper the Friendly Ghost; and subsequently spread in press and television. It was shared by popular figures of the Spanish media scene such as Mikel Iturriaga and Brays Efe, among others. According to an analysis of the social impact of Gaysper published in February 2021, the icon became the biggest topic of diffusion on the Internet in Spain on the day of its publication.

Warner Bros. would respond to Vox's tweet by stating that its company had not authorized the party to use its copyrighted images. On May 1, 2019, a representation of the icon would appear on an episode of the television program Late Motiv, in which he was "interviewed" by Andreu Buenafuente. His voice was represented by the director of the program, Bob Pop.

On May 21, 2019, PSOE deputies Felipe Sicilia and Arnau Ramirez would attend a parliamentary session in Congress wearing a T-shirt bearing the icon. Different merchandising items of the icon would become popular in the following months, on the occasion of the celebration of the International LGBT Pride Day. Likewise, versions derived from the symbol would become popular with other flags belonging to the collective, such as the transgender or the bisexual flag.

See also 

 Pink triangle
 Pride flag
 LGBT symbols

References 

2019 in Spain
Internet memes
LGBT culture
LGBT symbols
LGBT in Spain